Pamulaparthi Venkata Ranga Rao (1940 – 1 August 2013) was an Indian politician who belonged to the Indian National Congress. He was son of former Prime Minister of India, P. V. Narasimha Rao

Early life
Rao was born in Vangara village in Karimnagar district, Hyderabad state to P. V. Narasimha Rao and his wife Satyamma. He received his bachelor's and master's degrees from Osmania University. He had two younger brothers, P. V. Rajeshwar Rao and P. V. Prabhakar Rao, and also had five sisters. He remained a bachelor throughout his life.

Career
Rao was a two-time MLA from Hanamkonda in Warangal district and also a member of the Legislative Council. He served as Education Minister in the Kotla Vijaya Bhaskara Reddy cabinet. He died on 1 August 2013.

References

Indian National Congress politicians from Andhra Pradesh
Telangana politicians
People from Karimnagar district
1940 births
2013 deaths